Cantus is an eight-member male a cappella ensemble based in Minneapolis, Minnesota, USA.

Biography

Cantus is a full-time, professional vocal chamber ensemble, made up of eight men singing in a TTBB (tenor, tenor, baritone, bass), changed male voice arrangement. The artists are self-led, with programming and musical direction coming from within the group itself. The ensemble is known for innovative concert programming, often tying together works of numerous genres to explore a selected narrative, including classical music, orchestral-vocal repertoire, folk music, art song, popular songs, spirituals, and newly commissioned works.

The vocal group maintains a schedule of around 70 live concert performances and 30-40 education/outreach activities in a given season, both in the United States of America and abroad.  Cantus is an active proponent of music education, encouraging people of all ages - especially men - to sing. The ensemble has worked with tens of thousands of singers throughout the country in educational activities ranging from master classes to festivals and collaborations.  New members are acquired through annual national auditions.
The ensemble began as a student-run organization at St. Olaf College in 1995. After a successful northeast tour in the summer of 1998, Cantus transitioned into a professional ensemble and non-profit organization by 1999, based out of Minneapolis, MN.

Notability

Cantus is the only artist-led full-time vocal ensemble in the United States, and is one of two professional classical male vocal ensembles in the United States that pays its artists full-time salaries, while maintaining a year-round schedule of performances, the other being San Francisco's Chanticleer.

The ensemble received the 2009 Chorus America Margaret Hillis Award, the first collaborative ensemble to do so. The ensemble's regular work with students nationwide also garnered Chorus America's Education Outreach Award in 2011.

Cantus was selected by Minnesota Public Radio to be Artists in Residence for the 2010–11 season.  The residency included supported touring, radio co-hosting, and international broadcasts via Performance Today.

In recent seasons, Cantus has been featured with the Saint Paul Chamber Orchestra, Boston Pops, and on A Prairie Home Companion with Garrison Keillor.  2014  marked the final year of the group's critically acclaimed collaboration with Theater Latte Da, All Is Calm: The Christmas Truce of 1914, which tells the true story of the Christmas Truce of 1914, when World War I soldiers set down their arms to celebrate the holidays with the enemy.

Current members
Jacob Christopher (2016), tenor

Alex Nishibun (2019), tenor

Paul Scholtz (2015), tenor

Matthew Shorten (2022), tenor

Rod Kelly Hines (2021), baritone

Jeremy Wong (2021), baritone

Chris Foss (2008), bass

Samuel Green (2013), bass

Recordings
Cantus has released numerous critically acclaimed recordings in 24-bit, High-Resolution Compact Disc format, most of which were recorded by noted engineer and Stereophile Magazine Editor, John Atkinson.  The group's 2010, 2011, and 2012 releases That Eternal Day, Christmas with Cantus, and On the Shoulders of Giants brought in the Grammy Award-winning production team of Steve Barnett and Preston Smith for recording, engineering, and mastering.

A Harvest Home (2014)
Song of a Czech (2013)
On the Shoulders of Giants (2012)
Christmas with Cantus (2011)
That Eternal Day (2010)
Outside the Box (Limited Release) (2009)
All is Calm: The Christmas Truce of 1914 (2008)
While You Are Alive (2008)
Cantus (2007)
There Lies the Home (2006)
Cantus Live:  Vol. 2 (2006)
Comfort and Joy: Volume Two (2005)
Comfort and Joy: Volume One (2004)
Cantus Live: Vol. 1 (2004)
Deep River" (2003)
“...against the dying of the light” (2002)
Let Your Voice Be Heard (2001)

Student recordings
Vagabond (1999 - Student Recording)
Tidings (1998 - Student Recording)
Introit (1997 - Student Recording)

Former members
Kurt Anderson, baritone    (1996–1999)

Brian Arreola, tenor    (1995–2005)

Nathan Bird, tenor    (2010-2011)

Dashon Burton   (2005–2009)

E. Mani Cadet, tenor   (2006–2007)

Kelvin Chan, baritone    (2000–2005)

Zachary Colby, tenor    (2014-2019)

Brad Cramer-Erbes, tenor    (2002–2005)

Alan Dunbar, bass-baritone    (1998–2004)

Adam Fieldson, tenor     (2015-2018)

David Geist, baritone    (2016-2020)

Matthew Goinz, baritone     (2014-2018)

Michael Hanawalt, tenor    (1996–2004)

Eric Hopkins Ellingsen, tenor    (2008-2011)

Curt Hopmann, tenor    (2000–2001)

Aaron Humble, tenor   (2005–2015)

Brook Jacobsen, baritone/tenor    (1995–1999)

Albert Jordan, tenor    (1995–2006)

Michael Jones, tenor (2006-2008)

Sam Kreidenweis, baritone  (2018-2020)

Erick Lichte, bass-baritone    (1995–2003)

Mitch Lewandowski, bass    (1995–1996)

Tom McNichols, bass (2004-2008)

Phillip Moody, baritone    (1996–2000)

Blake Morgan, tenor (2014-2015)

Alberto de la Paz, tenor (2017-2022)

Tom Phelps, bass    (1996–1998)

Adam Reinwald, baritone (1997-2014)

Paul John Rudoi, tenor (2008-2016)

Gary Ruschman, tenor (2004-2014)

Joe Shadday, tenor (2015-2016)

Shahzore Shah, tenor (2005-2015)

Kjell Stenberg, baritone    (1995–1998)

Timothy C. Takach, bass (1996-2013)

Matthew Tintes, baritone (2009-2016)

Lawrence Wiliford, tenor    (1995-2002)

David Walton, tenor (2011-2014)

Paul Wilson, baritone    (1999–2002)

Peter Zvanovec, tenor    (1999–2006)

External links
 Cantus Sings
 Soundcloud
 Meet Cantus! on YouTube
 Featured on the PBS program MN Original from the TPT St. Paul, MN Station: MN Original Videos

References

Choirs in Minnesota
Musical groups from Minnesota
A cappella musical groups
Musical groups established in 1995